The 83rd Clifford Cup tournament was held between the 16 and 25 February 2018. The 2018 Clifford Cup took place after the conclusion of the regular season, with teams seeded based on their performance in the 2017-18 Dialog Rugby League season.

Navy SC, who finished in second place at the end of the domestic season by a solitary point, competed in the opening quarter-final match at the Colombo Racecourse ground, against the seventh placed Police SC. The lead changed numerous times during the game however Navy SC's captain, Dulanjana Wijesinghe, scored a try in the dying minutes providing Navy SC with a 36-28 victory and a semi-final berth. The top seeded team in the competition, Kandy SC (the previous cup winner and the undefeated Dialog league champion) faced the eighth seeded Air Force SC (who had only managed two wins in the domestic season) in the second quarter-final match held at the Pallekele International Cricket Stadium. Kandy SC dominated the first half of the game, scoring three tries and a penalty to nil, with the final result being 53 points to fourteen. The third seed, Havelock SC, played their quarter final match against Army SC, at Police Park. Whilst Army SC scored the first try of the game, Havelock SC led 19-10 at halftime, going on to win 41 points to 20 and advanced to the semi-finals. In the remaining quarter final match fourth placed Colombo Hockey and Football Club faced Ceylonese Rugby & Football Club at the Colombo Racecourse, in a repeat of the final game of the domestic fixtures. This time however CR & FC made a fast start to the game and were never challenged by Colombo running out eventual winners 46 (seven tries) to 29 (four tries).

The Sri Lanka Rugby Football Union appointed Sam Jones, a Western Australian rugby referee, to officiate in the semi-finals and the final, with Les Cash, an English referee as an assistant official.

In the first semi-final encounter played at the Pallekele International Cricket Stadium Kandy SC defeated a gallant CR & FC 38 points to 26 points, running in five tries to four. The other semi-final match between Navy SC and Havelock SC at the Colombo Racecourse was a closer affair, with the scored tied 12 all at half time (two tries apiece). Navy SC the scored back to back penalties and a try after the half time break before Raveen De Silva was sin binned, this led to a resurgence by Havelock SC scoring successive tries and regaining the lead 26 to 25. Havelock SC however conceded a penalty in the dying minutes of the game, which was converted by Navy SC taking them through to the finals.
 
The final was held at Longdon Place on Sunday 25 February. Danushka Ranjan opened the scoring for Kandy SC with a try, which Nigel Rattwatte failed to convert. The score line remained at five to nil for most of the first half until Rattwatte put through a penalty right under the posts to extend Kandy SC's lead by another 3 points, with an eight to nil score at half time. After the break Navy SC’s Mohommed Absal capitalised on a mistake by Fazil Marija scoring a try, which was converted by Thilina Weerasinghe. Ranjan then scored his second try with a dive into the corner, with Thilina Wijesinghe failing to convert from a difficult angle. Wijesinghe extended Kandy SC's lead by the putting through a penalty, which was followed by a try from Shehan Pathirana. Navy SC failing to add to their earlier converted try with the final score of 21 to seven. Kandy SC repeating their success in 2017 by winning both the League and Clifford Cups, in an undefeated season, with club stalwart Marija retiring from domestic rugby competition.

Bracket

Matches

Quarter-finals

Semi-finals

Final

References

2018
2018 rugby union tournaments for clubs
2018 in Asian rugby union
2018 in Sri Lankan sport